Kelvin Kerkow  (born 22 April 1969) is an Australian lawn bowls and indoor bowls player and author.

Early life
Kerkow was born in 1969 in Kingaroy, Queensland. At the age of seven, he contracted Guillain–Barré syndrome which led to him being unable to walk for several years. His parents, Ivan and Joan introduced him to bowls when he was unable to play contact sports due to his limited mobility.

Bowls career
Outdoors he won two bronze medals in the singles and triples in the 1996 World Outdoor Bowls Championship and a silver medal in the fours at the 2004 World Outdoor Bowls Championship. He also secured the 2006 Commonwealth Games singles gold medal in Melbourne. He is also a three times title winner at the Asia Pacific Bowls Championships in 1995, 2001 and 2003.

Indoors Kelvin has won three World Indoor Championships Pairs gold medals. In the 1996 World Indoor Bowls Championship he partnered Ian Schuback, and in the 2005 World Indoor Bowls Championship and 2009 World Indoor Bowls Championship he partnered Mervyn King. In addition he has won the gold medal at the 2007 World Cup Singles in Warilla, New South Wales, Australia, the 2006 Scottish International Open and was twice winner of the Welsh International Open in 2004 and 2005.

Other Achievements
Australian Indoor Singles Winner
Welsh Master Invitation champion 1997
World Bowls Singles Bronze Medallist 1996
Australian Representative 1995-2008
Gold Coast Winter Carnival Singles 1995
Hub of the Hunter invitation Singles 1994
Welsh invitation Singles 1996
Coolangatta Master of Masters 1993
Golden Nugget invitation Singles 1994 &1997
Halekulani invitation Singles 1995
Mt Isla Invitation Singles 1999
Halekulani Invitation Singles 1999

Publications
In January 2009 Kerkow released his autobiography Rolled Gold in which he tells the story of his childhood battle with Guillain–Barré syndrome and how lawn bowls helped him overcome his disability with help from his friend Steve Glasson.

Honours
In 2000, Kerkow was a recipient of the Australian Sports Medal. Kerkow received the Medal of the Order of Australia in 2010 for his services as a player, coach and mentor. In 2017, Kerkow was inducted as a Legend in the Bowls Australia Hall of Fame.

References 

Australian male bowls players
1969 births
Living people
Commonwealth Games gold medallists for Australia
Bowls players at the 2006 Commonwealth Games
Indoor Bowls World Champions
Commonwealth Games medallists in lawn bowls
People from Kingaroy
Medallists at the 2006 Commonwealth Games